WPEA (90.5 FM) is a non-commercial educational radio station licensed to serve Exeter, New Hampshire.  The station is owned by the Trustees of Phillips Exeter Academy.  It airs a Variety format. The WPEA studios are located in the Elizabeth Phillips Academy Center on the campus of the Phillips Exeter Academy.

WPEA is the oldest continuously operated high school radio station in the United States. The station was assigned the WPEA call letters by the Federal Communications Commission.

Awards 
 Marconi College Radio Award, "Most Outstanding High School Radio Station" – 1992

References

External links
WPEA official website

Phillips Exeter Academy
PEA
High school radio stations in the United States
Rockingham County, New Hampshire
Exeter, New Hampshire
Radio stations established in 1964